is a Japanese Nippon Professional Baseball player for the Hokkaido Nippon-Ham Fighters in Japan's Pacific League. Before playing for the Fighters he was a member of the Yomiuri Giants.

External links

1981 births
Japanese baseball players
Hokkaido Nippon-Ham Fighters players
Living people
Nippon Ham Fighters players
Nippon Professional Baseball catchers
People from Saga (city)
Yomiuri Giants players
Japanese baseball coaches
Nippon Professional Baseball coaches